Conservative Way Forward (CWF) is a British pressure and campaigning group, which is Thatcherite in its outlook and agenda. Margaret Thatcher was its founding President.

Conservative Way Forward was founded in 1991 to "defend and build upon the achievements of the Conservative Party under Margaret Thatcher's leadership, and to adapt the principles of her era in government to modern concerns and challenges".

The group organises speaker meetings, seminars and receptions, supported and attended by Government Ministers past and future.

In all leadership elections since 1997, the candidate supported by Conservative Way Forward has ultimately won.

Conservative Way Forward is to be relaunched in 2022 by MP Steve Baker who will be its new chairman.

Margaret Thatcher Library
On 14 April 2013, the group announced that it was setting up a Margaret Thatcher Library as a permanent memorial to the former Prime Minister. The project will be based on the Ronald Reagan Presidential Library in California, and has the support of several current and former Conservative cabinet members. It is expected to run training courses for young Conservatives and exchange student programmes to the US and elsewhere, as well as house artifacts from her premiership.

Officers
In December 2015 Paul Abbott resigned as chief executive, and Donal Blaney resigned as chairman, following the suicide of Elliott Johnson soon after being made redundant as an employee of Conservative Way Forward. This followed the resignations of Minister of State for International Development Grant Shapps, and the expulsion from the Conservative Party of Mark Clarke, following allegations of bullying of Elliott Johnson.

Executive director:
 Chrissie Boyle (2015–)

Founding President:
 Margaret Thatcher

Honorary Vice Presidents:
 Christopher Chope, former Transport Minister and former Chairman of Conservative Way Forward
 Liam Fox, International Trade Secretary and former Defence Secretary
 Greg Hands, former Chief Secretary to the Treasury
 William Hague, former Foreign Secretary
 Norman Tebbit, former Party Chairman
 Sajid Javid, Home Secretary, former Communities Secretary and Business Secretary

Parliamentary Council 
Chairman:
 Gerald Howarth, former defence minister (2015–)

Deputy Chairman:
 James Cleverly

Council Members
 Conor Burns
 Greg Hands
 Charlie Elphicke
 Liam Fox

Board of Management 
Chairman
 Gerald Howarth

History 
Former Honorary Chairmen:
 Cecil Parkinson (1991–1997)
 Eric Forth (1997–2001)
 Christopher Chope (2001–2009)
 Don Porter CBE (2009–2012)
 Donal Blaney (−2015)

References

External links
 Conservative Way Forward

1991 establishments in the United Kingdom
Organisations associated with the Conservative Party (UK)
Organizations established in 1991
Right-wing politics in the United Kingdom